Ophiusa triphaenoides is a moth of the family Erebidae. It is found from the Indian subregion to China, Taiwan, Thailand, Burma, Sumatra and Borneo. It has also been recorded from Palau.

The larvae feed on Terminalia, Shorea, Syzygium  and Pinus species.

External links
Species info

Ophiusa
Moths of Asia
Moths of Japan
Moths described in 1858